Marcelo Ramiro Camacho, or simply Marcelo Camacho (born March 24, 1980 in Rio de Janeiro) is a Brazilian footballer Who plays for Madureira.

Career
His previous clubs include Grêmio, Bangu, CFZ, Botafogo and Vitória of Brazil, Saudi clubs Al-Hilal, Al-Shabab and Al-Ahli, and Al-Arabi of Qatar.

Camacho distinguished himself in Brazilian football in 2003, when operated in the Botafogo and helped the team climb back into the First Division Championship. In the penultimate game of the square end of the Series B, Camacho scored two goals in the victory of alvinegro by 3 to 1 on Marilia, the game that sealed the access of the club. After a period ranging from the reserve team, was traded in 2005 for the Arab football.

Club career statistics

Honours

Al-Hilal FC
Saudi Premier League: 2004-05
Crown Prince Cup: 2005 2006

Al-Shabab KSA
Saudi Champions Cup: 2008
Saudi Champions Cup: 2009

Al-Ahli
Saudi Champions Cup: 2012

 Madureira 
Taça Rio: 2015

External links
 zerozero
Photo of Camacho

Brazilian people of Italian descent
Brazilian expatriate footballers
Association football midfielders
Footballers from Rio de Janeiro (city)
Brazilian footballers
1980 births
Living people
Botafogo de Futebol e Regatas players
Al Hilal SFC players
Al-Shabab FC (Riyadh) players
Al-Arabi SC (Qatar) players
Al-Ahli Saudi FC players
Esporte Clube Vitória players
Al-Sailiya SC players
Expatriate footballers in Saudi Arabia
Brazilian expatriate sportspeople in Saudi Arabia
Expatriate footballers in Qatar
Brazilian expatriate sportspeople in Qatar
Campeonato Brasileiro Série A players
Madureira Esporte Clube players
Qatar Stars League players
Saudi Professional League players